Andrew Norwell (born October 25, 1991) is an American football guard for the Washington Commanders of the National Football League (NFL). He played college football at Ohio State and was signed as an undrafted free agent by the Carolina Panthers in 2014. Norwell has also played for the Jacksonville Jaguars.

High school career
Norwell attended Anderson High School in Cincinnati, Ohio.

College career
Norwell played college football at Ohio State University from 2010 to 2013. He started 39 of 50 games. During his true freshman year, Norwell was the primary backup at right tackle in 2010 and played in 11 games. He named to a Big Ten all-freshman team by Rivals.com. During his sophomore year, Norwell started 13 games and started at both the left guard and left tackle positions. He was named honorable mention all-Big Ten. During his junior season, Norwell played more downs than any player on offense with 862. The Ohio State coaches named him co-offensive lineman of the year. He helped Ohio State average 242.2 yards per game rushing, ranking 10th nationally in 2012, lead the Big Ten in scoring at 37.1 points per game, and was named first-team all-Big Ten. Norwell was named to the first-team all-Big Ten Conference for the second consecutive season. He graduated in May 2014 with a degree in communications.

Professional career

Carolina Panthers

Despite his decorated college career, Norwell went undrafted in the 2014 NFL Draft and signed with the Carolina Panthers as a free agent. Norwell signed a three-year, $1.5 million contract on May 12, 2014.

Norwell was inserted into the starting lineup in Week 7. Following Week 10, Pro Football Focus rated Norwell as the ninth best guard in the NFL, ahead of two other high-profile rookie guards, Zack Martin and Joel Bitonio. His insertion into the starting lineup at left guard helped stabilize the offensive line, and over his last six games at left guard, Pro Football Focus rated Norwell as the fourth-best left guard in the NFL. His emergence into the starting lineup helped the Panthers rank seventh in the NFL in rushing, including a league-leading 975 yards over the last five games. He also helped the Panthers to back-to-back division titles for the first time since the formation of the NFC South division. Norwell was also among the least penalized players at the position and through the entire season, did not allow a single sack and only one quarterback hit.

Through the first three games of the 2015 season, Norwell allowed only two quarterback pressures and one sack. Norwell was part of the Panthers team that played in Super Bowl 50. On March 7, 2017, the Panthers placed a second-round tender on Norwell, who was set to be a restricted free agent. On April 17, 2017, Norwell officially signed his tender with the Panthers. Norwell started all 16 games at left guard, on his way to being named first-team All-Pro. He was also ranked as the third best guard in the league according to Pro Football Focus.

Jacksonville Jaguars

On March 15, 2018, Norwell signed a five-year, $66.5 million contract with the Jacksonville Jaguars with $30 million guaranteed, which at the time made him the highest-paid guard in the league. He started the first 11 games at left guard before suffering an ankle injury in Week 12. He was placed on injured reserve on November 26, 2018.

On November 28, 2020, Norwell was placed on injured reserve after suffering a forearm injury in Week 11. On December 19, 2020, Norwell was activated off of injured reserve.

In March 2021, Norwell agreed to a contract restructuring that resulted in a pay cut and shortening the remainder of his contract to one year, making him a free agent after the 2021 season.

Washington Commanders
Norwell signed a two-year contract with Washington Commanders on March 17, 2022.

References

External links
 Washington Commanders bio
 Ohio State Buckeyes bio

1991 births
Living people
Players of American football from Cincinnati
American football offensive guards
Ohio State Buckeyes football players
Carolina Panthers players
Jacksonville Jaguars players
Washington Commanders players